Duke Xiang of Jin (died 621 BC) was from 627 to 621 BC the ruler of the State of Jin, a major power during the Spring and Autumn period of ancient China. His ancestral name was Ji, given name Huan, and Duke Xiang was his posthumous title.  He succeeded his father Duke Wen of Jin, who was the Hegemon of China.

Battle of Yao
After Duke Wen died in the ninth month of 628 BC, Duke Mu of Qin sent an army to attack the State of Zheng.  They retreated without attacking Zheng, but destroyed the minor state of Hua instead.  In the fourth month of the following year, when the Qin army was passing through Jin territory on their way back to Qin, Jin launched a surprise attack at the Battle of Yao (殽之戰), annihilated the Qin army and captured three Qin generals.  Jin annexed the Hua state. After the battle, the power of Qin in the east had been checked for a long period.

Succession
Duke Xiang reigned for seven years and died in the eighth month of 621 BC.  His son Crown Prince Yigao was then still a boy, and there was a major succession crisis, with different factions supporting Duke Xiang's brothers Prince Yong and Prince Le.  Yigao eventually ascended the throne with the support of Zhao Dun (趙盾) and would come to be known as Duke Ling of Jin.

References

Year of birth unknown
Monarchs of Jin (Chinese state)
7th-century BC Chinese monarchs
621 BC deaths